Paweł Sobolewski (born 20 June 1979 in Ełk) is a former Polish footballer (midfielder).

Career
He joined that team in the winter break 2006/07. His former team was Jagiellonia Białystok. He was one of the biggest stars of Jagiellonia Białystok and the Polish II liga in the last few seasons. He played quite weak in 06/07 season.

References

External links 
 

1979 births
Living people
People from Ełk
Polish footballers
Jagiellonia Białystok players
Korona Kielce players
Wigry Suwałki players
Ekstraklasa players
Sportspeople from Warmian-Masurian Voivodeship
Association football midfielders
Mazur Ełk players